Mohr–Coulomb theory is a mathematical model (see yield surface) describing the response of brittle materials such as concrete, or rubble piles, to shear stress as well as normal stress. Most of the classical engineering materials follow this rule in at least a portion of their shear failure envelope. Generally the theory applies to materials for which the compressive strength far exceeds the tensile strength.

In geotechnical engineering it is used to define  shear strength of soils and rocks at different effective stresses.

In structural engineering it is used to determine failure load as well as the angle of fracture of a displacement fracture in concrete and similar materials.  Coulomb's friction hypothesis is used to determine the combination of shear and normal stress that will cause a fracture of the material. Mohr's circle is used to determine which principal stresses will produce this combination of shear and normal stress, and the angle of the plane in which this will occur. According to the principle of normality the stress introduced at failure will be perpendicular to the line describing the fracture condition.

It can be shown that a material failing according to Coulomb's friction hypothesis will show the displacement introduced at failure forming an angle to the line of fracture equal to the angle of friction. This makes the strength of the material determinable by comparing the external mechanical work introduced by the displacement and the external load with the internal mechanical work introduced by the  strain and stress at the line of failure. By conservation of energy the sum of these must be zero and this will make it possible to calculate the failure load of the construction.

A common improvement of this model is to combine Coulomb's friction hypothesis with Rankine's principal stress hypothesis to describe a separation fracture. An alternative view derives the Mohr-Coulomb criterion as extension failure.

History of the development 
The Mohr–Coulomb theory is named in honour of Charles-Augustin de Coulomb and Christian Otto Mohr.  Coulomb's contribution was a 1773 essay entitled "Essai sur une application des règles des maximis et minimis à quelques problèmes de statique relatifs à l'architecture"
.
Mohr developed a generalised form of the theory around the end of the 19th century.
As the generalised form affected the interpretation of the criterion, but not the substance of it, some texts continue to refer to the criterion as simply the 'Coulomb criterion'.

Mohr–Coulomb failure criterion 

The Mohr–Coulomb failure criterion represents the linear envelope that is obtained from a plot of the shear strength of a material versus the applied normal stress. This relation is expressed as

The quantity  is often called the cohesion and the angle  is called the angle of internal friction. Compression is assumed to be positive in the following discussion.

If , the Mohr–Coulomb criterion reduces to the Tresca criterion. On the other hand, if  the Mohr–Coulomb model is equivalent to the Rankine model.

From Mohr's circle we have

where

Therefore, the Mohr–Coulomb criterion may also be expressed as

This form of the Mohr–Coulomb criterion is applicable to failure on a plane that is parallel to the  direction.

Mohr–Coulomb failure criterion in three dimensions 
The Mohr–Coulomb criterion in three dimensions is often expressed as

The Mohr–Coulomb failure surface is a cone with a hexagonal cross section in deviatoric stress space.

If the unit normal to the plane of interest is

The Mohr–Coulomb failure criterion can then be evaluated using the usual expression

for the six planes of maximum shear stress.

{| class="toccolours collapsible collapsed" width="60%" style="text-align:left"
!Derivation of normal and shear stress on a plane
|-
|Let the unit normal to the plane of interest be

where  are three orthonormal unit basis vectors. Then the traction vector on the plane is given by

The magnitude of the traction vector is given by

Then the magnitude of the stress normal to the plane is given by

The magnitude of the resolved shear stress on the plane is given by

In terms of components, we have

|}

Mohr–Coulomb failure surface in Haigh–Westergaard space 
The Mohr–Coulomb failure (yield) surface is often expressed in Haigh–Westergaad coordinates. For example, the function

can be expressed as

Alternatively, in terms of the invariants  we can write

where 

{| class="toccolours collapsible collapsed" width="80%" style="text-align:left"
!Derivation of alternative forms of Mohr–Coulomb yield function
|-
|We can express the yield function

as

The Haigh–Westergaard invariants are related to the principal stresses by

Plugging into the expression for the Mohr–Coulomb yield function gives us

and straightforward substitution.
|}

Mohr–Coulomb yield and plasticity 
The Mohr–Coulomb yield surface is often used to model the plastic flow of geomaterials (and other cohesive-frictional materials). Many such materials show dilatational behavior under triaxial states of stress which the Mohr–Coulomb model does not include. Also, since the yield surface has corners, it may be inconvenient to use the original Mohr–Coulomb model to determine the direction of plastic flow (in the flow theory of plasticity).

A common approach is to use a non-associated plastic flow potential that is smooth. An example of such a potential is the function

Typical values of cohesion and angle of internal friction 
Cohesion (alternatively called the cohesive strength) and friction angle values for rocks and some common soils are listed in the tables below.

See also
 3-D elasticity
 Hoek–Brown failure criterion
 Byerlee's law
 Lateral earth pressure
 von Mises stress
 Yield (engineering)
 Drucker Prager yield criterion — a smooth version of the M–C yield criterion
 Lode coordinates

References

 https://web.archive.org/web/20061008230404/http://fbe.uwe.ac.uk/public/geocal/SoilMech/basic/soilbasi.htm
 http://www.civil.usyd.edu.au/courses/civl2410/earth_pressures_rankine.doc

Solid mechanics
Soil mechanics
Plasticity (physics)
Materials science
Applied mathematics
Yield criteria